We at Solglantan (Swedish: Vi på Solgläntan) is a 1939 Swedish comedy film directed by Gunnar Olsson and starring Dagmar Ebbesen,  Rut Holm and Nils Lundell. It was shot at the Sundbyberg Studios in Stockholm. The film's sets were designed by the art director Max Linder.

Cast
 Dagmar Ebbesen as Agnes Johansson
 Rut Holm as Rut Månsson
 Nils Lundell as Tjär-Kalle
 Britta Brunius as 	Greta Månsson
 Folke Hamrin as Sten Johansson
 Julia Cæsar as 	Julia Torpare
 Nils Hallberg as 	Emil
 Kerstin Berger as Bettan
 Sven-Eric Gamble as 	Åke Johansson 
 Allan Linder as 	Rudolf 'Rulle' Torpare
 Kaj Hjelm as 	Jerker
 Åke Grönberg as Svensson
 Wiktor Andersson as 	Johansson
 Gustaf Lövås as 	Karlsson
 Carl Browallius as Chairman of City Board
 Eleonor de Floer as 	Lisa Morell
 Georg Funkquist as Laundry Owner
 Torsten Hillberg as 	Karlin
 Ivar Kåge as 	Member of City Board
 Bellan Roos as 	Mrs. Svensson
 Artur Cederborgh as Police Officer
 Mona Geijer-Falkner as Vegetable Customer 
 Carl Hagman as Morell 
 Arne Lindblad as 	Seidel 
 Siri Olson as 	Telephone Operator
 Lisa Wirström as 	Mrs. Jönsson

References

Bibliography 
 Holmstrom, John. The Moving Picture Boy: An International Encyclopaedia from 1895 to 1995, Norwich, Michael Russell, 1996, p. 169.

External links 
 

1939 films
Swedish comedy films
1939 comedy films
1930s Swedish-language films
Films directed by Gunnar Olsson
1930s Swedish films